Maja  (minor planet designation: 66 Maja) is a carbonaceous background asteroid from the central regions of the asteroid belt, approximately 71 kilometers in diameter. It was discovered on 9 April 1861, by American astronomer Horace Tuttle at the Harvard College Observatory in Cambridge, Massachusetts, United States. The asteroid was named after Maia from Greek mythology.

Orbit and classification 

Maja is a non-family asteroid from the main belt's background population. It orbits the Sun in the central asteroid belt at a distance of 2.2–3.1 AU once every 4 years and 4 months (1,571 days; semi-major axis of 2.65 AU). Its orbit has an eccentricity of 0.17 and an inclination of 3° with respect to the ecliptic. The body's observation arc begins at the Harvard Observatory, one night after its official discovery observation.

Physical characteristics 

In the Tholen classification, Maja is a carbonaceous C-type asteroid, while in the SMASS classification it is a "hydrated" carbonaceous subtype (Ch).

Rotation period and spin axes 

Several rotational lightcurves of Maja have been obtained from photometric observations since 1988. Analysis of the best-rated lightcurve by French amateur astronomers Maurice Audejean and Jérôme Caron from February 2011 gave a rotation period of 9.73509 hours with a brightness amplitude of 0.25 magnitude.

In 2016, a modeled lightcurve was derived from various photometric database sources, giving a concurring sidereal period of 9.73570 hours and two spin axes of (49.0°, −70.0°) and (225.0°, −68.0°) in ecliptic coordinates.

Diameter and albedo 

According to the surveys carried out by the Infrared Astronomical Satellite IRAS, the Japanese Akari satellite and the NEOWISE mission of NASA's Wide-field Infrared Survey Explorer, Maja measures between 62.87 and 82.28 kilometers in diameter and its surface has an albedo between 0.03 and 0.0759.

The Collaborative Asteroid Lightcurve Link adopts the results obtained by IRAS, that is, an albedo of 0.0618 and a diameter of 71.82 kilometers based on an absolute magnitude of 9.36.

Naming 

This minor planet was named by Harvard's former president, J. Quincy, after Maia, one of the Seven Sisters of the Pleiades in Greek mythology. She is the mother of Hermes (Mercury) and the daughter of Atlas and Pleione. The official naming citation was mentioned in The Names of the Minor Planets by Paul Herget in 1955.

Double naming 

In 1861, the director of the discovering observatory, George Phillips Bond, raised a minor concern since these names had already been applied to some of the brightest stars of the Pleiades in the constellation of Taurus: Maia, Electra, Asterope and Merope.

Spacecraft visits 
At present, Maja has not been visited by any spacecraft. As of 1988, mission planning for the Cassini–Huygens spacecraft included a Flyby (spaceflight) of Maja while leaving the inner solar system in March 1997, however due to delays, the launch of Cassini-Huygens was moved from April 1996 to October 1997, thus negating the option to pass near Maja. Cassini-Huygens passed by asteroid 2685 Masursky on  23 January 2000 instead.

References

External links 
 Disc-Integrated Radar Properties of Main-Belt Asteroids, JPL, Magri (2004)  
 Asteroid Lightcurve Database (LCDB), query form (info )
 Dictionary of Minor Planet Names, Google books
 Asteroids and comets rotation curves, CdR – Observatoire de Genève, Raoul Behrend
 Discovery Circumstances: Numbered Minor Planets (1)-(5000) – Minor Planet Center
 
 

000066
Discoveries by Horace Tuttle
Named minor planets
000066
000066
18610409